Warut Mekmusik (born February 21, 1992), or simply known as Jay, is a Thai professional footballer who plays as a goalkeeper for Thai League T1 club Bangkok United.

Honours

Clubs
Air Force United
 Thai Division 1 League: 2013

References

External links
 
 Profile at Goal

1992 births
Living people
Warut Mekmusik
Warut Mekmusik
Association football goalkeepers
Warut Mekmusik
Warut Mekmusik
Warut Mekmusik
Warut Mekmusik
Warut Mekmusik